Wakayama Prefecture held a gubernatorial election on December 17, 2006.

Sources 
 Japan Election coverage 

2006 elections in Japan
Wakayama gubernatorial elections
December 2006 events in Japan